Rosales is a barrio in the Chapinero locality of Bogotá.

Limits 
 North: Calle 82
 South: Calle 72
 West: Eastern Hills
 East: Carrera Séptima

Economy and culture  
Rosales is a wealthy neighborhood of Bogotá, Colombia. The neighborhood is known for brick high rises  which are found from Carrera Séptima (7th Avenue) to Avenida Circunvalar. 

The neighborhood was home to many affluent large homes until the late 1970s when families began selling their estates to make a large sum on multi-family dwellings.  The large red-brick high rises offered high class Bogotanos better security and residences that were easier to maintain.

Rosales is home to many embassies as it has easy access to both the North and Downtown Bogotá due to its proximity to Carrera Séptima and La Circunvalar. Other assets of Rosales are the numerous parks and creeks that flow down from the Andean mountains.

Points of interest 
There are several parks which have natural streams sourced from the mountains, such as Quebradas de Rosales and Alameda de Quebrada Vieja, both of which are frequently used for leisure activities.

Transportation 
Carrera Séptima and the Avenida Chile provide access to public transport. Other important streets are Carreras Quinta, Cuarta and Avenida Circunvalar.

References 

Neighbourhoods of Bogotá